The Brassicales (or Cruciales) are an order of flowering plants, belonging to the eurosids II group of dicotyledons under the APG II system. One character common to many members of the order is the production of glucosinolate (mustard oil) compounds. Most systems of classification have included this order, although sometimes under the name Capparales (the name chosen depending on which is thought to have priority).

The order typically contains the following families:
 Akaniaceae – two species of turnipwood trees, native to Asia and eastern Australia
 Bataceae – salt-tolerant shrubs from America and Australasia
 Brassicaceae – mustard and cabbage family; may include the Cleomaceae
 Capparaceae – caper family, sometimes included in Brassicaceae
 Caricaceae – papaya family
 Cleomaceae
 Gyrostemonaceae – several genera of small shrubs and trees endemic to temperate parts of Australia
 Koeberliniaceae – one species of thorn bush native to Mexico and the US Southwest
 Limnanthaceae – meadowfoam family
 Moringaceae – thirteen species of trees from Africa and India
 Pentadiplandraceae – African species whose berries have two highly sweet tasting proteins
 Resedaceae – mignonette family
 Salvadoraceae – three genera found from Africa to Java
 Setchellanthaceae
 Tiganophytaceae
 Tovariaceae
 Tropaeolaceae – nasturtium family

Classification 
The following diagram shows the phylogeny of the Brassicales families along with their estimated ages, based on a 2018 study of plastid DNA:

On 20 April 2020, a newly described monotypic species from Namibia, namely, Tiganophyton karasense  is placed under this order as a monotypic member of new family Tiganophytaceae, which is closely related to Bataceae, Salvadoraceae and Koeberliniaceae.

Historic classifications 
Under the Cronquist system, the Brassicales were called the Capparales, and included among the "Dilleniidae".  The only families included were the Brassicaceae and Capparaceae (treated as separate families), the Tovariaceae, Resedaceae, and Moringaceae.  Other taxa now included here were placed in various other orders.

The families Capparaceae and Brassicaceae are closely related.  One group, consisting of Cleome and related genera, was traditionally included in the Capparaceae but doing so results in a paraphyletic Capparaceae.  Therefore, this group is generally now either included in the Brassicaceae or as its own family, Cleomaceae.

References

External links 

 
Angiosperm orders